Novara di Sicilia (Gallo-Italic of Sicily: Nuè; Sicilian: Nuvara) is a comune (municipality) in the Metropolitan City of Messina in the Italian region of Sicily, located about  east of Palermo and some  southwest of Messina.

Novara di Sicilia borders the following municipalities: Fondachelli-Fantina, Francavilla di Sicilia, Mazzarrà Sant'Andrea, Rodì Milici, Tripi.

History

Noa, a word of Sicani origin, means “fallow field” (equivalent of Italian ), as it was an agricultural area. Under the Romans, it changed to Novalia ('grain field'); and for the Arabs, it was Nouah ('garden, flower'). Other names in the Middle Ages include Nucaria, the Nuara, the Nucharia, Nugaria, Nutaria, Nocerai, and Noara, before the definitive transformation to Novara.

After the fall of the Western Roman Empire, it remained under Byzantine hands until the Arab conquest of Sicily. The Sicilian emirate lost it in the 11th century, when it fell under control of the Normans, who populated the town with people from Lombardy.  The population, called Lombards of Sicily, indeed still speaks a distinctive dialect called Gallo-Italic of Sicily.

Main sights
 

The village, nestled in the mountains overlooking ancient Tyndaris and Abacaenum and with notable views of the Aeolian Islands, is the archetype of a typical medieval town.
There are five churches. The 16th century Cathedral is in the Piazza Duomo.  The Churches and palace ruins were constructed by the craftsmen of the town.  Other churches include Santa Maria di Noara, S. Nicolò, S. Antonio, S. George and Annunziata. There are also palaces from the 16th through 18th centuries.

The anthropological museum, which features tools of local farmers and artisans as well as displaying the early culture of the local people, is also of note. The intricate cobbled streets form a mosaic between the ancient small houses that stand shoulder to shoulder along the mountainside.

Festivals and annual events

The Festival of Saint Anthony Abbot is celebrated in January, with a parade of horses and livestock and a “Blessing of the Animals” in the bell tower.

Events during Carnival include the “Gioco of the Maiorchino”, where wheels of maiurchèa (a seasoned pecorino cheese) are rolled along a predetermined route, the Carnival of the Children and a masked ball which takes place in the recently renovated Communal Theatre.

Pastoral rituals with a silent procession of the Confraternite occur during Holy Week.

In July there is a Flower Festival and the “Climbing of the Rocca Salvatesta”, which is seen as a test of character.

The Festa dell'Assunta (the assumption of the Virgin Mary) is the largest annual event in the town, attracting thousands of visitors. The festivities run from July 31 to August 15, when a procession is held with a statue of the Virgin (the patron saint of the town), illuminated with more than 150 candles, is carried through the streets on the shoulders of more than 30 men. The relics of Saint Hugh are also included in the procession and each every five years statues of other saints also join in. The event is followed by a firework display.

In the first few weeks of August an exhibition is held of vestments, church furnishings, handicrafts, paintings, photographs and local handicraft.

A “Living Manger” is displayed during the Christmas period.

Transportation

Railways 
It is served by trains run by Trenitalia, including services from Messina. Outside of the station is available a Uber service by App.

Bus and tram 
Novara di sicilia is served by bus service run by Azienda Siciliana Trasporti.

People
 Franco Cucinotta (born 1952)
 Antonio Sabato (born 1958)

References

External links

 Official website  

Cities and towns in Sicily